Blue Ridge may refer to any of the following:

Places

Canada
Blue Ridge, Alberta

United States
Blue Ridge, Alabama
Blue Ridge, Arizona
Blue Ridge, Georgia
Blue Ridge, Indiana
Blue Ridge, Missouri
Blue Ridge, New York, a hamlet in the town of North Hudson
Blue Ridge (Hamilton County, New York), a ridge in the towns of Lake Pleasant and Indian Lake
Blue Ridge, Texas
Blue Ridge, Virginia
Blue Ridge, Seattle, Washington
Blue Ridge Berryessa Natural Area, California
Blue Ridge Dam, a hydroelectric dam in Fannin Co., Georgia
Lake Blue Ridge, a lake created by the completion of Blue Ridge Dam
Blue Ridge Mountain (New York), an elevation in Hamilton County
Blue Ridge Mountains, a major range of the Appalachian Mountains
Blue Ridge Mountain, in Virginia and West Virginia
Blue Ridge Parkway, a road running through the Blue Ridge Mountains
Blue Ridge Road, a 19-mile scenic highway in the Adirondacks, New York
Blue Ridge Summit, Pennsylvania
Blue Ridge Wilderness Area, a wilderness area in the Adirondacks, New York

Arts entertainment, and media
Blue Ridge (album), a 1985 album featuring Jonathan Edwards and The Seldom Scene
Blue Ridge (2010 film)
Blue Ridge (2020 film)

Brands and enterprises
Blue Ridge (dishware), a type of American dishware manufactured by Southern Potteries, Inc. in the 1930s, 1940s, and 1950s
Blue Ridge Capital, a private equity firm and hedge fund
Blue Ridge Communications, a cable television provider in eastern Pennsylvania

Transport
Blue Ridge (Amtrak), a passenger train
USS Blue Ridge, a list of Navy ships
USS Blue Ridge (AGC-2), an amphibious force flagship that served from 1943 to 1947
USS Blue Ridge (ID-2432) or the Great Lakes passenger steamer Virginia in service for less than a year during 1918
USS Blue Ridge (LCC-19), a command and control ship serving as the Seventh Fleet command ship

See also
Blue Ridge High School (disambiguation)
Blue Ridge Railway (disambiguation)